Pilot Grove Township is one of fourteen townships in Cooper County, Missouri, USA.  As of the 2000 census, its population was 1,134.

Geography
According to the United States Census Bureau, Pilot Grove Township covers an area of 36.18 square miles (93.7 square kilometers); of this, 35.94 square miles (93.09 square kilometers, 99.35 percent) is land and 0.24 square miles (0.61 square kilometers, 0.65 percent) is water.

Cities, towns, villages
 Pilot Grove

Unincorporated towns
 Chouteau Springs at 
(This list is based on USGS data and may include former settlements.)

Adjacent townships
 Lamine Township (north)
 Boonville Township (east)
 Palestine Township (southeast)
 Clear Creek Township (southwest)
 Blackwater Township (northwest)

Cemeteries
The township contains these four cemeteries: Mount Vernon, Pleasant Hill, Saint Joseph, and Saint Martin's in Chouteau Springs.

Major highways
  Interstate 70
  U.S. Route 40
  Route 41
  Route 135

School districts
 Boonville School District
 Pilot Grove C-4

Political districts
 Missouri's 6th congressional district
 State House District 117
 State Senate District 21

Notable people
 America McCutchen Drennan (1830–1903), educator and missionary

References
 United States Census Bureau 2008 TIGER/Line Shapefiles
 United States Board on Geographic Names (GNIS)
 United States National Atlas

External links
 US-Counties.com
 City-Data.com

Townships in Cooper County, Missouri
Townships in Missouri